James Tift Champlin (June 9, 1811 – March 15, 1882) was the seventh President of Colby College, Maine, United States, from 1857-1873.

Early life
James Tift Champlin was born in Colchester, Connecticut on June 9, 1811.

He died in Portland, Maine on March 15, 1882.

Career

References

Presidents of Colby College
1811 births
1882 deaths